Robert Ford is an American sportscaster who is the lead voice of the Houston Astros, replacing Milo Hamilton and other announcers Dave Raymond and Brett Dolan.

Biography
Before moving up to the booth, Ford hosted the Astros' pregame and postgame radio shows. He performed the same role with the Kansas City Royals before coming to Houston. His other baseball play-by-play experiences came from the Binghamton Mets, Yakima Bears, and the Kalamazoo Kings. Outside of baseball, he called Binghamton Bearcats women's and select men's basketball. He also called select high school football and basketball games for WCDO. In 2003 and 2004, Ford was named Frontier League Broadcaster of the Year.

Personal
Ford grew up in The Bronx and attended The Bronx High School of Science, before moving on to Syracuse University (S.I. Newhouse School of Public Communications), from which he graduated with a bachelor's degree in broadcasting journalism in 2001.

References

External links
Staatalent.com
Houston.astros.mlb.com
Crawfishboxes.com

Year of birth missing (living people)
Living people
American sports announcers
College basketball announcers in the United States
High school basketball announcers in the United States
High school football announcers in the United States
Houston Astros announcers
Kansas City Royals announcers
Major League Baseball broadcasters
Minor League Baseball broadcasters
People from the Bronx
Syracuse University alumni
The Bronx High School of Science alumni
Women's college basketball announcers in the United States